The Drama Coal Mine is a coal mine in Greece. The mine is located in Drama Prefecture in East Macedonia and Thrace. The mine has coal reserves amounting to 1 billion tonnes of lignite, one of the largest lignite reserves in Europe.

See also

 Energy in Greece

References 

Coal mines in Greece
Drama (regional unit)